Born to Be Bad is a 1934 American pre-Code drama film starring Loretta Young and Cary Grant, and directed by Lowell Sherman.

This film was rejected by the Hays Office twice before it was finally approved. Young's character, an unwed mother who entertains wholesale buyers to secure contracts for her friend, had to be re-written and re-filmed, so that her occupation is only hinted at. Zanuck had to cut as much as possible shots of Young in her underwear and of her legs exposed to the hips. The box-office return was poor, with a loss of $50,000.

Plot
An unwed mother named Letta Strong (Loretta Young) was raised in a healthy family environment, but she became pregnant at the age of fifteen and ran away from home. Letta was eventually taken in by an elderly man named Fuzzy (Henry Travers). In due course, Strong gave birth to Mickey (Jackie Kelk) in the back room of Fuzzy's bookstore. Surviving life as a grifter, Letta taught her son Mickey to be streetwise, so that he would not be mistreated like she was. All the while, Fuzzy strongly disapproves of how Letty is raising her son. At age seven, Mickey decides to skip school and wander aimlessly around town. Meanwhile, Letty earns a living by entertaining buyers in order to prop up her friend Steve Karns (Russell Hopton).

One day a milk truck driven by Malcolm "Mal" Trevor (Cary Grant) hits Mickey as he is roller-skating in the street. When Letty's acquired lawyer, Adolphe (Harry Green), learns that Mal is the wealthy president of Amalgamated Dairies, he talks Letty into seizing an emerging opportunity in the form of money. Both Adolphe and Letty convince Mickey to lie about the extent of his injuries. However, during the trial, Mal's attorney (Paul Harvey) produces films showing a fully recovered Mickey. The irate judge has Mickey taken from Letty and put in an institution for boys.

Mal and his wife Alyce (Marion Burns) have no children. Mal offered to adopt Mickey and with Letty's approval. She was able to visit with her son frequently. Mickey thrived on Mal's country estate, as he was in a loving environment. Mickey enjoyed having a stable home, of which consisted of a doting father and mother.

Letty is not satisfied with this arrangement and she wants her son back. At Adolphe suggestion, Letty seduces Mal into falling in love with her, while recording the whole scheme. Since her objective is the return of her son Mickey, Letty has no love for Mal, but he falls for her and they spend the night together. However, the next morning Mal informs a surprised Letty that he has already told his wife about their affair. Alyce is willing to sacrifice herself for Mal's happiness. Letty comes to realization of her true feelings for Mal, and breaks off the relationship, all the while pretending to have only been toying with him. She returns to Fuzzy and asks for her old job back at the bookstore.

Cast
 Loretta Young as Letty Strong
 Cary Grant as Malcolm "Mal" Trevor
 Jackie Kelk as Mickey Strong
 Marion Burns as Alyce Trevor
 Henry Travers as Fuzzy
 Paul Harvey as Attorney Brian
 Russell Hopton as Steve Karns
 Etienne Girardot as J. K. Brown - Claim Adjustor
 Geneva Mitchell as Miss Crawford - Malcolm's Secretary
 Guy Usher as Judge McAffee
 Charles Coleman as Trevor's Butler
 Wade Boteler as Guard at Trevor Estate
 Harry Green as Adolphe - Letty's Lawyer

Reception
Kingsley Grace, a reviewer from the Los Angeles Times wrote "this film is a lapse of taste and hardly expected" and noted that the "affair" between Letty and Mal was underdone

Another film critic, Mae Tinee, who worked at the Chicago Daily Tribune remarked on how the persona Letty taught her son to break laws. Born to be Bad was defined as a picture that inspired the anti smut campaign. Tinee stated that "this film is thoroughly reprehensible and should have never been made into a feature film."

References 

 Tinee, Mae (30 June 1934).

External links
 
 
 
 

1934 films
American black-and-white films
Films scored by Alfred Newman
Films directed by Lowell Sherman
1934 romantic drama films
American romantic drama films
Films produced by Darryl F. Zanuck
Twentieth Century Pictures films
United Artists films
1930s American films